AHT may refer to:
American Hairless Terrier
Aldershot railway station, UK, National Rail code

Aht may refer to:
Nuu-chah-nulth people

See also 
 Acht (disambiguation)
 Axt (disambiguation)